The President of the Government of Vojvodina serves as the head of government of the Autonomous Province of Vojvodina, within the Republic of Serbia.

Officeholders

Socialist Autonomous Province of Vojvodina
 Parties

Autonomous Province of Vojvodina
 Parties

See also
List of local rulers of Vojvodina
President of the Presidency of SAP Vojvodina
President of the Assembly of Vojvodina

Politics of Vojvodina
Vojvodina